Shatadhanvan or Shatadhanus was the 8th Emperor of the Maurya dynasty. He ruled from 195–187 BCE. According to the Puranas, he was the successor of Devavarman Maurya and reigned for eight years. He was succeeded by Brihadratha Maurya.

Notes

Mauryan emperors 
2nd-century BC Indian monarchs
2nd-century BC births
180s BC deaths